BZU may refer to:

Bahauddin Zakariya University, Multan, Punjab, Pakistan
Bir Zeit University, West Bank